Marumakal is a 1952 Indian Malayalam-language family drama film directed by M. K. Chari, written by Kedamangalam Sadanandan and produced by Paul Kallungal. The film marks the onscreen debut of Prem Nazir, who played the lead role, and also features Kedamangalam Sadanandan, T. S. Muthaiah, S. J. Dev, Neyyattinkara Komalam, Revathi, Ammini, S. V. Susheela, Vijayalakshmi and Durga Varma in other prominent roles.

Cast
 Prem Nazir (credited as Abdul Khader)
 Kedamangalam Sadanandan
 T. S. Muthaiah
 S. J. Dev
 Neyyattinkara Komalam

Box office
The film was commercial success.

References

External links
 
 Marumakal at the Malayalam Movie Database

1950s Malayalam-language films
Indian drama films
1952 drama films